In enzymology, a FAD diphosphatase is an enzyme that catalyzes the chemical reaction

FAD + H2O  AMP + FMN

Thus, the two substrates of this enzyme are FAD and H2O, whereas its two products are AMP and FMN.

This enzyme belongs to the family of hydrolases, specifically those acting on acid anhydrides in phosphorus-containing anhydrides.  The systematic name of this enzyme class is FAD nucleotidohydrolase. Other names in common use include FAD pyrophosphatase, riboflavin adenine dinucleotide pyrophosphatase, flavin adenine dinucleotide pyrophosphatase, riboflavine adenine dinucleotide pyrophosphatase, and flavine adenine dinucleotide pyrophosphatase.  This enzyme participates in riboflavin metabolism.

References

 
 

EC 3.6.1
Enzymes of unknown structure